Reames is a surname. Notable people with the surname include:

Alfred E. Reames (1870–1943), American attorney and politician
Britt Reames (born 1973), American baseball player
John Reames (1942–2008), British football manager
Richard Reames (born 1957), American arborsculptor